Mara Navarria (born 18 July 1985) is an Italian right-handed épée fencer, 2018 individual world champion, two-time Olympian, and 2021 team Olympic bronze medalist.

Personal life
Navarria grew up in Carlino, Udine and took up fencing at AS Sangiorgina (now Gemina Scherma) in San Giorgio di Nogaro under the coaching of Dario Codarin. After her secondary studies in Cervignano, she moved to Rome to join Centro Sportivo Esercito, the sport section of the Italian Army, under coach Oleg Pouzanov.

Navarria married her physical trainer Andrea Lo Coco. They have a son, Samuele. Her sister Caterina and her brother Enrico are sabre fencers.

Career
She won the Fencing World Cup in the junior category in 2004 and 2006. She was first selected into the senior Italian team for the 2005 European Fencing Championships, where she finished 49th in the individual event and 9th with the team.

In the 2009–10 season Navarria was part of the Italian team that earned a silver medal after being defeated in the final by Poland. The year after, at the World Championships on home ground, in Catania, Navarria was stopped in the table of 16 by Poland's Magdalena Piekarska and finished 12th. In the team event, Italy lost in the semifinal to China, which had just placed two fencers on the individual podium. They defeated Germany 45–33 to win the bronze medal.

Navarria began the 2011–12 season by her first victory in the senior World Cup with a gold medal in Doha, followed by a silver medal in Budapest. She qualified to the 2012 Summer Olympics as a member of the Italian team. In the individual event, she was defeated in the table of 32 by Maya Lawrence of the United States. In the team event, Italy lost to the United States in the first round and ended up 7th after the ranking matches. Navarria finished the season 12th in world rankings, a career best as of 2014.

Navarria took a break in her career in the 2012–13 season to give birth to a son, Samuele. She came back to competition at the 2013 Mediterranean Games in Mersin, where she finished 7th. At the World Championships in Budapest, she was stopped in the quarter-finals by Russia's Anna Sivkova, who eventually earned a silver medal. In the team event Italy lost to Russia 27 to 28 in the quarter-finals and finished 5th.

The following season, Navarria reached the quarter-finals in the Havana and Rio de Janeiro World Cup tournaments. In the 2014 European Championships, she lost to France's Lauren Rembi in the second round. In the team event, Italy were defeated by Romania in the semi-finals. They then prevailed over Estonia to earn a bronze medal. In the World Championships in Kazan, Navarria was knocked off in the second round by Estonia's Erika Kirpu, who would eventually take the silver medal. In the team event, Italy took revenge on Romania in the quarter-finals, but lost to Estonia in the semifinal. They overcame Hungary in the small final to earn a bronze medal.

In the 2014–15 season Navarria climbed her first World Cup podium since her comeback with a silver medal in Barcelona after losing in the final to China's Xu Anqi.

Medal Record

Olympic Games

World Championship

European Championship

Grand Prix

World Cup

References

External links

Profile at the European Fencing Confederation
 at the Italian Fencing Federation

Italian female épée fencers
Living people
Olympic fencers of Italy
Fencers at the 2012 Summer Olympics
Universiade medalists in fencing
1985 births
Sportspeople from Udine
Universiade bronze medalists for Italy
Medalists at the 2009 Summer Universiade
Competitors at the 2013 Mediterranean Games
Mediterranean Games competitors for Italy
Fencers at the 2020 Summer Olympics
Olympic medalists in fencing
Medalists at the 2020 Summer Olympics
Olympic bronze medalists for Italy
World Fencing Championships medalists